The 1975 Kentucky Wildcats football team represented the University of Kentucky in the Southeastern Conference during the 1975 NCAA Division I football season. The Wildcats scored 132 points while allowing 183 points, finishing 2-8-1 overall, 0-6 in the SEC.

Season
Wally Pesuit and Tom Ranieri were chosen as team captains.

Kentucky opened with a 27-8 home victory against Virginia Tech, then lost 14-10 at home to Kansas, followed by a 10-10 tie at home against Maryland.  A road game against Penn State ended in a 10-3 loss, putting Kentucky at 1-2-1 entering SEC play.

Kentucky lost its home conference opener to Auburn, 15-9, and then lost 17-14 at LSU.  A 21-13 loss at Georgia was followed by a 23-10 home win against Tulane.  A 13-3 road loss at Vanderbilt and 48-7 road loss at Florida led to a 17-13 home loss in the season finale against Tennessee.

The 1975 Kentucky team lost only two games by more than 9 points, and had three losses by 4 or fewer points.  The Maryland team that tied Kentucky 10-10 finished the season as the Atlantic Coast Conference champions, with an undefeated record in conference play.

Schedule

Roster

| special_teams_players=

}}

Team players in the 1975 NFL Draft

References

Kentucky
Kentucky Wildcats football seasons
Kentucky Wildcats football